Begonia discrepans is a species of flowering plant in the family Begoniaceae. It is endemic to Myanmar and China.

References

discrepans
Flora of China
Flora of Myanmar